Cheshmeh Sefid (also Romanized as Cheshmeh Sefīd and Chashmeh Safīd) is a village in Sornabad Rural District, Hamaijan District, Sepidan County, Fars Province, Iran. At the 2006 census, its population was 179, in 51 families.

References 

Populated places in Sepidan County